Dylan Muse Sprayberry (born July 7, 1998) is an American actor known for portraying the young Clark Kent in the 2013 film Man of Steel and Liam Dunbar on the MTV series Teen Wolf from 2014 to 2017. From 2018 to 2019, Sprayberry played Henry Richmond in the American supernatural thriller television series Light as a Feather.

Early life
Sprayberry was born July 7, 1998, and raised in Houston, Texas, and later attended West University Elementary. He booked his first acting role at the age of three in a public service announcement for PBS. He continued working in commercials and print as a child.

His sister Ellery Sprayberry is an actress. Both children relocated to Los Angeles with their parents in 2006 in order to pursue their careers. He then attended Brighton Hall in Los Angeles in between pursuing his career.

Career
After relocating to Los Angeles, Sprayberry appeared in multiple comedy and drama network television shows, including iCarly, Tracey Ullman's State of the Union, Criminal Minds, and Glee. He also played supporting roles in the feature films The Three Gifts opposite Dean Cain and Bedrooms. He then landed the breakout role of the young Clark Kent in the 2013 film Man of Steel, the first film in the DC Extended Universe, opposite Amy Adams, Michael Shannon, Diane Lane, and Kevin Costner.

Sprayberry is best known for MTV's Teen Wolf in which he played the role of Liam Dunbar from 2014 to 2017. He first appeared on the show in a recurring role during the show's fourth season before being upped to series regular for its fifth season, which premiered on June 29, 2015. He appeared at Comic-Con with the Teen Wolf cast before the show concluded in 2017. He originally auditioned for the part of Young Derek in season 3, but he was too young at the time. During his time on the show, Sprayberry accumulated a significant fanbase.

In 2016, he appeared in the adventure film Vanished – Left Behind: Next Generation. The film is based on The New York Times best-selling young-adult book Vanished by Tim LaHaye and Jerry Jenkins, and features a cast from MTV's Teen Wolf, Nickelodeon's The Haunted Hathaways, and Lifetime's Flowers in the Attic.

After the conclusion of Teen Wolf, Sprayberry continued his career with a supporting role in the 2018 thriller film Malibu Tapes, script writing, and recording his debut original EP. He plays the guitar, bass, and drums and, prior to appearing on Teen Wolf, was in a band called The Dead Toms. He is a fan of punk rock and cites his favorite bands as Black Flag, Minor Threat, The Stooges, Neck Deep, The Story So Far, and Blink-182.

Sprayberry cites Jack Nicholson, Robert De Niro, Sean Penn, Joaquin Phoenix, Tom Hardy, and Jake Gyllenhaal as his inspirations.

In September 2021, it was announced that a reunion film for Teen Wolf had been ordered by Paramount+, with Jeff Davis returning as a screenwriter and executive producer of the film. The majority of the original cast members, including Sprayberry, were set to reprise their roles. The film was released on January 26, 2023.

Filmography

Film

Television

Awards and nominations

References

External links

 
 
 Dylan Sprayberry Profile on MTV

1998 births
Living people
American male child actors
21st-century American male actors
Male actors from Houston
Male actors from Los Angeles